The enzyme phenylpyruvate decarboxylase catalyzes the chemical reaction

phenylpyruvate  phenylacetaldehyde + CO2

This enzyme belongs to the family of lyases, specifically the carboxy-lyases, which cleave carbon-carbon bonds.  The systematic name of this enzyme class is phenylpyruvate carboxy-lyase (phenylacetaldehyde-forming). This enzyme is also called phenylpyruvate carboxy-lyase.  This enzyme participates in phenylalanine and tryptophan metabolism.

Structural studies

As of late 2007, only one structure has been solved for this class of enzymes, with the PDB accession code .

References

 

EC 4.1.1
Enzymes of known structure